Broadfield railway station served the district of Broadfield in Heywood in Greater Manchester, England from 1869 until October 1970, when the station was closed and passenger services between Bolton &  were withdrawn by British Rail.  The line through the station has since been reopened by the heritage East Lancashire Railway, although the station itself remains disused.

References

The Manchester and Leeds Railway by Martin Bairstow

Disused railway stations in the Metropolitan Borough of Rochdale
Former Lancashire and Yorkshire Railway stations
Railway stations in Great Britain opened in 1869
Railway stations in Great Britain closed in 1970
1869 establishments in England